The Mukojima white-eye (Apalopteron familiare familiare), incorrectly known as the Mukojima honeyeater, is the extinct nominate subspecies of the Bonin white-eye (formerly Bonin honeyeater). It occurred on Muko-jima and Nakodo-jima in the northern group of the Ogasawara Islands. The last record were specimens taken in January 1930 on Muko-jima; by then, the bird was already gone from Nakodo-jima. In 1941, the subspecies was found to have gone extinct in the meantime.

References
 Kittlitz, Heinrich von (1830): [Description of Apalopteron familiare] Mem. presentes a l'Acad. Imp. des Sci. de St. Petersbourg par divers savants, etc. 1(3): 235, plate 13.

white-eye, Mukojima
Extinct animals of Japan
Extinct birds of Oceania
white-eye, Mukojima
Endemic birds of Japan
white-eye, Mukojima
Birds described in 1830
Taxa named by Heinrich von Kittlitz

ja:ムコジマメグロ